Rasmus Kristian Ricardt Madsen (November 5, 1905 – August 7, 1993) was a Danish boxer who competed in the 1928 Summer Olympics.

He was born in Kværkeby, Zealand and died in Copenhagen.

In 1928 he was eliminated in the second round of the featherweight class after losing his fight to Georges Boireau.

External links
profile

1905 births
1993 deaths
Featherweight boxers
Olympic boxers of Denmark
Boxers at the 1928 Summer Olympics
Danish male boxers
People from Ringsted Municipality
Sportspeople from Region Zealand